The 2020–21 Houston Baptist Huskies men's basketball team represented Houston Baptist University in the 2020–21 NCAA Division I men's basketball season. The Huskies, led by 30th-year head coach Ron Cottrell, played their home games at Sharp Gymnasium in Houston, Texas as members of the Southland Conference.

Previous season
The Huskies finished the 2019–20 season 4–25, 4–16 in Southland play to finish in last place. They failed to qualify for the Southland Conference tournament.

Roster

Schedule and results

|-
!colspan=12 style=| Non-conference Regular season

|-
!colspan=12 style=| Southland Regular season

|-
!colspan=9 style=| Southland tournament

Source

References

Houston Christian Huskies men's basketball seasons
Houston Baptist Huskies
Houston Baptist Huskies men's basketball
Houston Baptist Huskies men's basketball